Ilovăț is a commune located in Mehedinți County, Oltenia, Romania. It is composed of six villages: Budănești, Cracu Lung, Dâlbocița, Firizu, Ilovăț and Racova.

References

Communes in Mehedinți County
Localities in Oltenia